The 1945–46 Sussex County Football League season was the 21st in the history of the competition.

Teams were placed into two separate leagues, Eastern Division and Western Division. With the winners of each league playing in a play-off to decide the overall winner.

Clubs
The league featured 17 clubs, 11 which competed in the 1939–40 season, along with six new clubs:
 Crawley
 Bexhill Wanderers
 Brighton & Hove Albion Juniors
 CADM & TC (Eastbourne) 
 H.M.S. Peregrine (Ford)
 R.A.F. Tangmere

Eastern Division

League table

Western Division

League table

Play-off Final

Haywards Heath 1 — 0 Worthing
Source= Sussex County league - Historic League Tables

References

1945-46
9